"Camouflage" is a song by Stan Ridgway, released as the third single from his 1986 debut solo album The Big Heat. The song was a chart hit in Europe, peaking at No. 2 in Ireland and No. 4 in the United Kingdom, but did not enter the chart in the US.

A cover version of the song was published in 2016 by the Swedish power-metal band Sabaton in the album The Last Stand .

Lyrics
The song, written in the style of a cowboy ballad, is sung from the viewpoint of a young PFC (Private first class) of the United States Marine Corps during the Vietnam War. On a search and destroy mission ("hunting Charlie down") he becomes separated from his patrol. Alone in the jungle, he feels himself surrounded and begins to fear for his life; just then, a "big marine" introducing himself as "Camouflage" comes to his rescue. The two fight together through the course of a night making their way back to base, during which the PFC notices that Camouflage is unaffected by bullets and is capable of superhuman feats. Camouflage leaves after leading the PFC to the edge of his camp. On his return, the PFC is informed that Camouflage had been on his deathbed for the past week, and died the previous night; just before his death, he said "Semper Fi" and expressed his last wish, "to save a young marine".

Charts

References

External links 
 

1985 songs
1986 singles
I.R.S. Records singles
Stan Ridgway songs
Songs written by Stan Ridgway
Songs of the Vietnam War